The 1996 AT&T Challenge was a men's tennis tournament played on outdoor clay courts at the Atlanta Athletic Club in Johns Creek, Georgia in the United States and was part of the World Series of the 1996 ATP Tour. It was the 11th edition of the tournament and was held from April 29 through May 5, 1996. Sixth-seeded Karim Alami won the singles title.

Finals

Singles

 Karim Alami defeated  Nicklas Kulti 6–3, 6–4
 It was Alami's 1st title of the year and the 1st of his career.

Doubles

 Christo van Rensburg /  David Wheaton defeated  Bill Behrens /  Matt Lucena 7–6, 6–2
 It was van Rensburg's 1st title of the year and the 21st of his career. It was Wheaton's only title of the year and the 6th of his career.

References

ATandT Challenge
Verizon Tennis Challenge
ATandT Challenge